Connect FM Peterborough (formerly 106.8 Lite FM) was a United Kingdom radio station serving Peterborough, The Deepings, Crowland, Spalding, Yaxley, Whittlesey & Stamford on 106.8FM and online at www.connectfm.com

History

The station launched as Lite FM 10:00am on Saturday 24 July 1999 with a live outside broadcast in Cathedral Square. The first song played was 'So Good' by Boyzone.  The first scheduled programme was Saturday Sport, with Neil Evans & Keith Hazelton. Lite rebranded to Connect in 2010 and moved from the city centre to the then Connect Northants territory of Kettering.

In February 2019, the station was sold to Communicorp with the station to be rebranded as Smooth East Midlands depending on Ofcom approval. Smooth took over broadcasting on 1 October 2019.

Ownership
The station is owned by Communicorp

On air
The station broadcast locally focused information and entertainment for the Peterborough area with dedicated local news, travel news and a wide choice of music for the city. Amongst the presenters during the final months as Connect were Liz Jeeves, Paul Lovett, Mikey Faulkner, Murray J and Daniel Fox - alongside long-serving Connect FM news journalist Carlo Fiorentino. The transmitter is situated at Gunthorpe  just off Paston Parkway on 106.8 FM. The station was also on DAB, smart speaker and online.

References

External links
 Lite FM 106.8
 Gunthorpe transmitter.
 MB21 - Gunthorpe mast

Radio stations in Cambridgeshire and Peterborough
Radio stations established in 1999
1999 establishments in England